Twin Imps is a summit in Idaho County, Idaho, in the United States. It forms part of the Seven Devils Mountains.

Twin Imps was named from Nez Perce mythology.

References

Mountains of Idaho County, Idaho
Mountains of Idaho